Libertarian Communist Party could refer to:

 Libertarian Communist Party (Brazil)
 Libertarian Communist Party (Spain)